Order of the Leopard is an order of the Republic of Kazakhstan, established by the Law of the Republic of Kazakhstan dated July 26, 1999 No. 462-1.

Regulation on the Order 
This order is awarded for special merits:

in strengthening the statehood and sovereignty of the Republic of Kazakhstan;
in ensuring peace, consolidation of society and unity of the people of Kazakhstan;
in state, industrial, scientific, socio-cultural and social activities;
in strengthening cooperation between peoples, rapprochement and mutual enrichment of national cultures, friendly relations between states.

Classes 
The Order of Bars has three classes:
Order "Barys" I class consists of a star and a badge on the shoulder ribbon - 100 mm wide.
Order "Barys" II class consists of a sign on the chest block ribbon - 32 mm wide.
Order "Barys" III class consists of a badge on the neck ribbon - 20 mm wide.

The highest degree of the order is the 1st degree. The award is made sequentially: III degree, II degree and I degree. In exceptional cases, for special distinctions, by decision of the head of state, awarding can be made without regard to sequence.

References 

Orders, decorations, and medals of Kazakhstan